Earth is the debut solo album by the English musician Ed O'Brien, released under the name EOB. It was released by Capitol Records on 17 April 2020. It was produced by Flood and Catherine Marks and features musicians including drummer Omar Hakim, Invisible members Nathan East and Dave Okumu, folk singer Laura Marling, Portishead guitarist Adrian Utley, Wilco drummer Glenn Kotche and Radiohead bassist Colin Greenwood. 

O'Brien, a member of Radiohead, had been writing music for years, but lacked confidence and felt his songs would not fit with Radiohead. After abandoning plans to make electronic music while living for a period in Brazil, he made demo recordings with producer Ian Davenport in 2014, then recorded with Flood from late 2017 to early 2019. 

Earth received mostly favourable reviews. O'Brien began a North American tour in February 2020; the full Earth tour was canceled due to the COVID-19 pandemic.

Writing and recording 
O'Brien is a member of the English band Radiohead, whose primary songwriter is Thom Yorke. O'Brien had written his own music for years, especially around the time of Radiohead's 1997 album OK Computer, but had never written lyrics. He said: "I was a bit like a dog at the Battersea dog’s home – I had no self-confidence, I was slightly beaten up." He wrote "Banksters" in 2009 in response to the 2007–2008 financial crisis.

In 2012, O'Brien and his family moved to Brazil, living for a year on a farm near Ubatuba. There, O'Brien planned to create electronic music using Ableton Live, inspired by dubstep and electronic musician Burial, but found it "didn't resonate with me in Brazil". Instead, he was inspired by the Primal Scream album Screamadelica (1991): "I put Screamadelica on for the first time in years and I had a fucking eureka moment ... It was rave, and it was connectedness, it was hope, it was powerful." He described attending Carnival as another "eureka moment", and said the album was inspired by "the spirit and being in Brazil ... open-heartedness, rhythm, colour".

O'Brien considered taking the songs to Radiohead, but felt they had a "distinct energy" that would be lost if it became a "hybrid product". He initially planned to have someone else sing, and considered asking Yorke. He decided to sing himself after he was pleased with his demo recordings, made with producer Ian Davenport in 2014. He recorded with producer Flood from late 2017 to early 2019, at Plas Dinam in the Cambrian Mountains in Wales and Flood's Assault & Battery studios in London.

O'Brien wanted to call the album Pale Blue Dot, in reference to the space photograph, but was prevented by copyright problems. He chose Earth as it was "direct" and he did not want anything ironic, obtuse or mysterious. O'Brien said he initially worried what Radiohead would think of the album, but decided: "Fuck that, I have to just be myself ... Of course you want the approval of your bandmates but it's not the be-all and end-all. This is my own thing. It’s different to Radiohead."

Earth features elements of alternative rock, post-Britpop,  dance-rock, tropical dance, bossa nova, and punk funk. NME described it as "a mix of tender folk and blissed-out rave".

Promotion and release 
In late 2019, O'Brien launched social media accounts to promote the album. On 4 October he released his first solo work, the ambient non-album track "Santa Teresa".

The first single from the album, "Brasil", was released on 5 December 2019, with a video directed by Andrew Donoho. The video shows humanity's response to an alien force that brings about greater community and understanding. Donoho said, "Ed and I both shared a love of space and the abstract concepts surrounding time, so I started building a narrative around transcending the physical barriers of our bodies and the temporal barriers of linear experience." The single was released on a limited 12" vinyl. On 6 February 2020, O'Brien announced the title, release date and track list, and released the second single, "Shangri-La". The third single, "Olympik", was released on 2 April. "Cloak of the Night", a duet with Laura Marling, was released on 9 April 2020.

O'Brien began a tour in February 2020, debuting songs in Toronto, Chicago, New York City and Los Angeles. A more expansive tour, with performances at larger venues and music festivals worldwide, was planned for mid-2020, but cancelled due to the COVID-19 pandemic. While promoting the album in interviews, O'Brien fell ill; in late March, he said he was recovering from a suspected COVID-19 infection.

Critical reception 

Earth received generally positive reviews from music critics. On the review aggregate website Metacritic, Earth received a score of 70 out of 100, based on 14 reviews, indicating "generally favorable reviews". Aggregator AnyDecentMusic? gave it 6.8 out of 10, based on their assessment of the critical consensus.

Writing for Clash, Sophie Walker gave the album a positive review, writing that it was "a reassuring anchor in these chaotic times [...] The on-edge instrumentation has distinct echoes of his [O'Brien's] Radiohead days, proving that unlike many bandmates that split from their main gig, O'Brien is in no rush to shake off their signature, and instead brings it forward into his own work: always evolving, always maturing." MusicOMH critic John Murphy particularly praised O'Brien's vocals, and wrote: "Throughout the album, O'Brien's voice is surprisingly strong and varied – on 'Shangri-La' it switches between a falsetto and his more usual lower range, while he duets beautifully with none other than Laura Marling on the closing 'Cloak of the Night'. While he may not be as distinctive as Thom Yorke (and let's face it, few are), it's good to hear him take a more prominent role than his usual backing vocals." Murphy wrote that the album was "well worth the wait".

NME reviewer Andrew Trendell praised "Brasil", saying that it "captures the full and kaleidoscopic range of this record; it's one-part tender folk lament and one-part dancefloor banger". Trendell concluded that "O'Brien's personality shines through, and it's a pleasure to get to know him. It's tempting to conclude he's Radiohead's secret weapon." In Rolling Stone, Angie Martoccio called Earth an "exceptional solo debut"; he praised O'Brien's vocals and considered "Cloak of the Night" the album's "gut-wrenching highlight". Dylan Barnabe of Exclaim! wrote that Earth was  "an impressive solo debut from O'Brien" and "one of this year's more fully-formed albums", with "swaths of texture and sonic landscapes that unfold amid layered synth, soaring guitars, rattling percussion and O'Brien's unwavering vocals".

Martin Toussaint from DIY gave the album a lukewarm review, saying it "might provide moments of hope and compassion across its runtime, but for the majority it feels too indirect and underplayed". Emily Mackay of The Observer said that "for all its ambition, [Earth] will mainly be of interest to Radiohead completists". Timothy Monger of AllMusic wrote that "Earth often recalls the late 90s, when the aftermath of Britpop and the burgeoning electronica scene collided with rave, folk, and other disparate elements ... While those layered textures, pulsing beats, and unfolding guitar loops are fine, it's EOB as a reflective acoustic singer/songwriter that provides Earth's most authentic moments."

Accolades

Track listing

Personnel 
 Ed O'Brien – vocals, guitar, bass guitar, programming, percussion, keyboards
 Flood – production, synthesiser, guitar
 Catherine Marks – additional production (tracks 1, 4, 5, 8), programming
 Alan Moulder – mixing
 Adam "Cecil" Bartlett – engineering, programming
 Caesar Edmunds – mixing

Additional musicians 
 David Okumu – guitar (tracks 2, 4, 8)
 Nathan East – bass (tracks 4, 8)
 Omar Hakim – drums (tracks 2, 8)
 Laura Marling – vocals (tracks 5, 9)
 Colin Greenwood – bass (track 2)
 Adrian Utley – guitar (tracks 1, 7)
 Glenn Kotche – drums (track 5)
 Richie Kennedy – synthesiser, percussion, drums, programming

Charts

References 

2020 debut albums
Albums produced by Flood (producer)
Capitol Records albums
Post-Britpop albums
Alternative rock albums by British artists
Dance-rock albums